Throughout all 52 weeks in 2012, 21 songs topped the Mega Single Top 100. The Single Top 100 is a chart composed by MegaCharts based on official physical single sales and legal downloads, and one of the three official Dutch record charts, the two others being the Dutch Top 40 and the Mega Top 50. The first number-one hit on the chart in 2012 was Michel Teló's "Ai se eu te pego!", and the last was will.i.am and Britney Spears' "Scream and Shout".

Artists and acts that had or were featured in at least one song that topped the Mega Single Top 100 that year for at least one week were Michel Teló, Chris Hordijk, Joan Franka, Triggerfinger, Gusttavo Lima, Jan Smit, Gerard Joling, René Froger, Nick & Simon, Asaf Avidan, Sandra van Nieuwland, PSY, Adele, Roos van Erkel, Robbie Williams, Leona Philippo, will.i.am and Britney Spears. Out of these acts, eleven of them, Michel Teló, Chris Hordijk, Joan Franka, Triggerfinger, Gusttavo Lima, Asaf Avidan, Sandra van Nieuwland, Psy, Roos van Erkel, Leona Philippo and will.i.am, achieved their first number-one single on the chart that year, either as lead or featured artist. Sandra van Nieuwland had the most number one hits, achieving five singles that topped. The other artist to have more than one number-one hit was Jan Smit with 3 songs. 18 singles that topped the chart in 2012 were solo songs, while three others were collaborations. "Ai se eu te pego!" was the best-performing single of that year, topping the Single Top 100's 2012 year-end chart.

Chart history
Source:

See also
2012 in music
List of Dutch Top 40 number-one singles of 2012

References

External links
Single Top 100 at the compiler MegaChart's official site - 

Single Top 100
Netherlands Single Top 100
2012 Single Top 100